New Lebanon Cumberland Presbyterian Church and School is a historic Presbyterian church and school located on Route A in New Lebanon, Cooper County, Missouri. The church was built in 1859, and is a one-story, brick building with restrained Greek Revival style detailing. The cross-gable roof is topped by a small clapboarded belfry. The school is a small one-story frame building sheathed in clapboard.

It was listed on the National Register of Historic Places in 1979. It is located in the New Lebanon Historic District.

References

Individually listed contributing properties to historic districts on the National Register in Missouri
Presbyterian churches in Missouri
Churches on the National Register of Historic Places in Missouri
Greek Revival church buildings in Missouri
Churches completed in 1859
Schools in Cooper County, Missouri
Cumberland Presbyterian Church
National Register of Historic Places in Cooper County, Missouri
1859 establishments in Missouri